Hasma (harsmar, hashima) is a Chinese and widely Central Asian dessert ingredient made from the dried fatty tissue found near the fallopian tubes of true frogs, typically the Asiatic grass frog (Rana chensinensis). Because of its whitish appearance, hasma is often called  "snow frog fat". Hasma is relatively expensive, so it is reserved for special occasions and in high-end restaurants.

Production
Hasma is produced primarily in the Heilongjiang, Jilin, and Liaoning provinces in China. Previously part of Chinese imperial cuisine, soups made with hasma are now widely available in North American cities with large Chinese populations and in Mainland China, Taiwan, Singapore and Hong Kong, albeit at a high price.

Physical characteristics
Hasma is sold dried as irregular flat pieces and flakes ranging from 1–2 cm in length and 1–5 mm in thickness. Individual pieces are yellowish-white in color with a matte luster, and may be covered with off-white pellicles. When rehydrated, dried hasma can expand up to 10-15 times in size.

The dried hasma is rehydrated and double-boiled with rock sugar to create a glutinous texture and opaque color. Dried or rehydrated hasma has a slight fishy smell. In its unflavored form it is sweet and slightly savory in taste with a texture that is glutinous, chewy, and light, quite similar to that of tapioca in a dessert.

Preparation

Hasma serves the role of providing texture to tong sui, or sweet soups, as well as increasing the perceived luxuriousness and prestige of the soup. These soups are usually flavored with rock sugar. For the uninitiated, this relatively accessible eating experience belies the exotic sounding nature of the dessert. Hasma is widely featured in dessert dishes in high class restaurants in Hong Kong.

Hasma is most commonly paired in sweet soups with:
Jujubes
Dried longan fruits
Lotus seeds

It is also a key ingredient in making "Three snow soup", which consists of:
Chinese pear
Snow fungus

Hasma can also be included in more exotic versions of shark fin soup.

Health claims
Hasma is taken for medicinal purposes in traditional Chinese medicine. Hasma is prescribed to treat respiratory symptoms, but there exists scarce scientific research to support this practice. It is also a suggested remedy for stomach ulcers and to improve the appearance of skin, and even for restored strength after childbirth.

References

External links
Hasma recipes
Description of a meal with Hasma
Recipe (in Chinese)

Chinese desserts
Offal